Tekasi is an islet in Penrhyn Atoll (Tongareva) in the Cook Islands. It is located on the north-west edge of the atoll, next to the northwest passage into the lagoon and north of Matunga. The island was once a camping place for fishermen.

References

Penrhyn atoll